Ray Monk  (born 15 February 1957) is a British biographer who is renowned for his biographies of Ludwig Wittgenstein, Bertrand Russell, and J. Robert Oppenheimer. He is emeritus professor of philosophy at the University of Southampton, where he taught in various capacities from 1992 to 2018.

Biography

Monk graduated with an MA in philosophy from York University in 1979. Later he obtained an MLitt from Oxford University.

He won the 1990 John Llewellyn Rhys Prize and the 1991 Duff Cooper Prize for his acclaimed biography of Ludwig Wittgenstein, Ludwig Wittgenstein: The Duty of Genius. His two-volume biography of Bertrand Russell appeared in 1996 and 2001. His biography of J. Robert Oppenheimer was published in 2012.

Since 2012 he has occasionally written for the New Statesman, contributing articles on philosophers and on veganism.

In 2015 he was elected as a Fellow of the Royal Society of Literature.

Works
Ludwig Wittgenstein: The Duty of Genius. London: Vintage, 1991.
Bertrand Russell: The Spirit of Solitude 1872–1921. London: Vintage, 1996.
Russell. London: Weidenfeld & Nicolson, 1997.
Bertrand Russell: The Ghost of Madness 1921–1970. London: Vintage, 2001.
How to Read Wittgenstein. London: Granta, 2005.
Inside the Centre: The Life of J. Robert Oppenheimer. London: Jonathan Cape, 2012; Robert Oppenheimer: A Life Inside the Center. New York: Doubleday, 2013.
"Ludwig Wittgenstein: A Sketch of His Life" (chapter in A Companion to Wittgenstein, edited by Hans-Johann Glock and John Hyman. Wiley-Blackwell, 2017)

References

External links
 Home page
 Philosophy Bites podcast interview with Ray Monk on Philosophy and Biography
 WGBY audio recording of lecture "Philosophy Circa 1905"
 Leading, contemporary biographers Hermione Lee & Ray Monk and director Stephen Frears debate whether all biographies are fiction

1957 births
Living people
Academics of the University of Southampton
British biographers
British philosophers
British veganism activists
English biographers
Fellows of the Royal Society of Literature
John Llewellyn Rhys Prize winners